Kimbaya can mean:

Quimbaya language, an extinct Colombian language
AeroAndina MXP-150 Kimbaya, a Colombian light aircraft

See also
Quimbaya (disambiguation)